Leaving the Table (Danish: Man rejser sig fra bordet), also known as Dinner Party at the Moresco's (Danish:Atenselskab hos familien Moresco), is a 1906 oil-on-canvas group portrait painting by Laurits Tuxen depicting a dinner party in Danish businessman Jacob Heinrich Moresco's home north of Copenhagen. The painting was a gift to Moresco on the occasion of the 50th anniversary of his firm. Many of the 45 people seen in the painting are well-known businessman, politicians or other peers of the time.

Background

On 16 April 1856, Jacob Heinrich Moresco opened a store with women's clothing and fashion accessories at Amagertorv 13. His firm would later develop into the first large-scale industrial manufacturer of women's clothing in Denmark. Moresco is   one of the businessmen depicted on Peder Severin Krøyer's monumental 1895 group portrait painting From Copenhagen Stock Exchange in Børsen.

Creation
Leaving the Table was commissioned from Lauritz Tuxen as a gift to Moresco on the occasion of the 50th anniversary of his company on 16 April 1906. It was painted on the basis of a black-and-white photograph taken at a dinner party some time before the anniversary. The dinner party took place in Moresco's home, Villa Adelaïde, at Ordrupvej 119, in Ordrup. The house was named after Moresco's mother. The property was acquired by Gentofte Municipality in 1943 and the building was subsequently demolished to make way for Ordrup Park.

Provenance
Moresco died in October 1906. just a few months after the anniversary. The painting remained in the Moresco family for the next more than 70 years. On 23 April 1991, it was sold at a Bruun Rasmussen auction to Ole Abildgaard for DKK 480,000, then a price record for a Tuxen painting. The Danish Commission of Export of Cultural Assets (Kulturværdiudvalget) had the same year issued an export ban under the Act on Protection of Cultural Assets in Denmark (No. 332 of 4 July 1876).
 On 15 November 1995, it was sold at another auction, this time at Kunsthallen, for DKK 250.000. The buyer was by Kunstnyt.dk reported to be the Kolding-based businessman Christian Houe. He later moved it out of the country illegally and in 1997 sold it at a Sotheby's New York auction for US§ 84,000 (the equivalent of DKK 548,000). The buyer was New York-based art collector John Oden. On 22 October 2010, TV2 broadcastet a programme about the faith of the painting. In an interview with Oden, he stated that he had no intention of parting with the painting.

People

Related works
Tuxen painted a number of portrait studies of some of the people seen in the picture, including  Enevold Sørensen (Kolding City Hall, acquired in 1920), Charles Shaw (Skagens Museum), Morescos, Marie Warelius, Emil Hjort, Johannes Werner and N. P.Jensen.

See also
 Men of Industry
 The Hirschsprung family portrait

References

External links

 Source

Paintings by Laurits Tuxen
Group portraits by Danish artists
Cultural depictions of Danish men
1906 paintings